James McLurkin (born 1972) is a Senior Hardware Engineer at Google. Previously, he was an engineering assistant professor at Rice University specializing in swarm robotics. In 2005, he appeared on an episode of PBS' Nova and is a winner of the 2003 Lemelson-MIT Prize.

Early life 
McLurkin was born in 1972 in Baldwin, New York and graduated from Baldwin Senior High School in 1990. He built his first robot, Rover, in 1988.

Education and career 
McLurkin completed his PhD in computer science in May 2008 at the Massachusetts Institute of Technology Computer Science and Artificial Intelligence Laboratory. Previously, he earned his master's degree in electrical engineering from the University of California at Berkeley and B.S. from MIT.

As part of his doctoral research, McLurkin developed algorithms and techniques for programming “swarms” of autonomous robots to mimic the behavior of bees, including their abilities to cluster, disperse, follow, and orbit.

In 1995, McLurkin was invited by the Smithsonian Institution to speak about his life and career in a presentation for schoolchildren sponsored by the Smithsonian's Lemelson Center for the Study of Invention and Innovation.

References

External links
 Personal web page
 NOVA Science NOW feature, includes video segment
 Prototype Online: Inventive Voices podcast featuring a 2006 interview with James McLurkin - From the Smithsonian's Lemelson Center for the Study of Invention and Innovation website.

Lemelson–MIT Prize
1972 births
Living people
Rice University faculty
African-American engineers
21st-century American engineers
African-American scientists
Massachusetts Institute of Technology alumni
UC Berkeley College of Engineering alumni
American roboticists
21st-century African-American people
20th-century African-American people